Ezekiel Mowatt (born March 5, 1961) is a former American football tight end in the National Football League who played for the New York Giants and the New England Patriots. He played college football at Florida State University, catching a total of 40 passes for 378 yards and 3 touchdowns in four seasons. Mowatt caught a touchdown pass from Phil Simms in Super Bowl XXI.

In 1990, then-Boston Herald sportswriter Lisa Olson alleged she was approached and sexually harassed in a locker room by five semi-naked members of the New England Patriots football team, which included Mowatt, Michael Timpson and Robert Perryman, during a September 17 interview. Mowatt was fined $12,500 by the NFL for his alleged involvement.

In 1994, Mowatt founded Mowatt Inc, a janitorial service based out of Hackensack, New Jersey with regional offices located in Pennsylvania and Maryland.

See also
History of the New York Giants (1979-1993)

References

External links
Mowatt, Inc.

1961 births
Living people
People from Wauchula, Florida
American football tight ends
Florida State Seminoles football players
New York Giants players
New England Patriots players
African-American players of American football
Hardee High School alumni
21st-century African-American people
20th-century African-American sportspeople
Ed Block Courage Award recipients